The 1922–23 Brooklyn Wanderers F.C. season was the first season for the club and its first season in both the New Jersey State Soccer League and the American Soccer League. The team was formed by the Bay Ridge F.C. to play in the New Jersey State League while the Bay Ridge team continued to play in the First Division of the amateur New York State Association Football League. The team left the New Jersey State League in the middle of the season to join the American Soccer League as its eighth club.

New Jersey State Soccer League

American Soccer League

Pld = Matches played; W = Matches won; D = Matches drawn; L = Matches lost; GF = Goals for; GA = Goals against; Pts = Points

National Challenge Cup

Southern New York State Football Association Cup

Notes and references
Bibliography

Footnotes

Brooklyn Wanderers F.C.
American Soccer League (1921–1933) seasons
Brooklyn Wanderers F.C.